David Shiner (born September 13, 1953) is an American actor, clown, playwright and theater director.

Background and career
Shiner was born in Boston, Massachusetts. His father, Francis Shiner, was a computer programmer. Shiner, usually donning a small dunce cap, started as a street mime, first in Colorado, and later in France and Germany. He managed to get multiple gigs with various circuses, including performances with the German Circus Roncalli and the Swiss National Circus (Circus Knie). In between he toured performing a dual act with René Bazinet.

From 1990 he was featured in Cirque du Soleil's production Nouvelle Expérience, touring for 19 months through Canada and the USA and playing for another year in Las Vegas. With his antics, including stepping through, on and over much of the crowd and the staging of a mock silent-movie melodrama with four members of the audience, he may be the best-remembered of the Cirque's clowns. In 1995, he also starred in Man of the House.

The production was filmed for HBO and Shiner's popularity rendered him film roles as a clown in Lorenzo's Oil and as straight man to Bill Irwin in Sam Shepard's Silent Tongue. He and Irwin then created the two-man, wordless show Fool Moon, featuring music by the Red Clay Ramblers, which had also performed in Silent Tongue.

This "evening of inspired lunacy" ran from 1992–99, including three separate runs at Broadway. The show won a special Tony for "Live Theatrical Presentation" in 1999, a Drama Desk Award for Unique Theatrical Experience, and an Outer Critics Circle "Special Achievement" Award.

In 2000, Shiner originated the lead role of The Cat in the Hat in the Broadway stage musical Seussical. Later he toured Europe and Seattle with his shows David Shiner in the Round and Drop Everything. He made additional appearances on The Tonight Show, and is a guest director at the Wintergarden Theatre in Berlin and the Apollo Theatre in Düsseldorf. He has mentored and guest directed for LILALU, a German youth circus program.

In 2007, Shiner wrote and directed Cirque du Soleil's touring production Koozå, using such performers as Gordon White, Jason Berrent, Stephan Laundry, Michael Halvarson, Joshua Zehner and Christian Fitzherris for the original cast.

Following Kooza, Shiner then wrote and directed Cirque's infamous Banana Shpeel which was one of the most unsuccessful shows the company had produced. It premiered in 2009 and was cancelled soon the following year due to the poor reception by audiences and critiques alike. This was the first (and only) time this has happened to the company according to CEO Daniel Lemarre. Since the failed project, Shiner has not been re-hired by Cirque du Soleil.

In 2013, Shiner co-wrote and starred in the Off-Broadway revue show Old Hats with his Fool Moon co-star Bill Irwin. Musician Nellie McKay also performed in the 2013 show.

In 2016, Old Hats was revived in New York City in 2016 with Shiner and Irwin returning and a new third performer, musician Shaina Taub, in between sketches Taub performed original songs with a band. He also was featured in the American Theatre Wing's Working in the Theatre series that was centered on clowning.

References

External links

1953 births
American clowns
American male film actors
Cirque du Soleil performers
Living people
Male actors from Massachusetts
People from Boston